Josep Maria de Sagarra i de Castellarnau (Barcelona, 5 March 1894 – 27 September 1961) was a Catalan-language writer from Barcelona, Catalonia.

Biography 
Born in Barcelona in 1894, in the breast of a family of the Catalan nobility being son of the historian and sigilógrafo Fernando de Sagarra i de Siscar. He attended a Jesuit high school and studied law at the University of Barcelona, initially with the purpose of entering into a diplomatic career. However, he quickly decided to become a writer and at the age  of 18 won a prize of poetry in the Floral Games. He became a full-time journalist who worked as a correspondent in Germany and as a theatrical critic.

However, his main work developed in the field of literature, especially in theatre and poetry, that he wrote always in Catalan. He collaborated with assiduity in the press, especially in La publicidad and Mirador. It suits to remark also his work as a  translator: the Divine comedy of Dante, and the theatre of Shakespeare, Molière and Gogol. Part of his poetry was inspired by the popular chansonnier and by well-known ancient legends, what turned him into a very popular poet that, in many respects, occupied the place that had left empty Frederic Soler, Verdaguer, Guimerà or Maragall.

In 1955 he won the National Prize of Theatre for La Ferida Luminosa, whose version in Spanish was made by José María Pemán. In the last years of life he was a member of the Institute of Catalan Studies, the Academy of the Good Letters, General Council of Authors of Spain and the Board of the Big Cross of Alfonso X the Wise person. After a long illness, he died in Barcelona on September 27, 1961, and was laid to rest on the Cemetery of Montjuïc.

A good part of his works have been translated to several languages and some have been adapted to the cinema (El cafè de la Marina and La herida luminosa). His poems Lluís Llach, Guillermina Motta and Ovidi Montllor, among others, were set to music.

Main works

Poetry 
  (1914)
  (1916)
 , (1918)
 , (1922)
 , (1923)
 , (1925)
 , (1928), long poem in heroic verse
 , (1933)
 , (1936)
 , (1938)
 , (1950)
 , traducción de Dante, (1950)

Novel 
 , (1919)
 , (1929)
 , (1932) Award winner Joan Crexells

Anthologies of newspaper articles 
 , (1929)
 , (1937) o (1946)
 , (1959), in Spanish
 , (1954)
 "" (2001)
 "" (2004)

Theatre 
  (1918)
  (1921)
  (1922)
  (1923)
  (1923)
  (1925)
 , (1928), comedy
 , (1928), comedy
 , (1935)
 , (1929)
 , (1926)
 , (1929)
 , (2000)
 , (1931)
 , (1933)
 , (1934)
 , (1935)
 , (1946)
 , (1947)
 , (1948)
 , (1949)
 , (1950)
 , (1952)
 La herida luminosa, (1954)
 , (1955)
 ,translated from Molière, (1960)
 ,translated from Gogol, (1961)

Other works 
 , (1922)
 "" (1960), tourist guide
 , edition posthumously (1968), literary criticism

References

External links 
 Josep Maria of Sagarra at LletrA, Catalan Literature Online (Open University of Catalonia).

Writers from Barcelona
20th-century Spanish writers
20th-century Spanish male writers
1961 deaths
Members of the Institute for Catalan Studies
1894 births
Catalan-language poets
Translators to Catalan
Translators from Catalonia
20th-century translators